The Miss Kentucky Teen America Organization allows young American girls the opportunity to compete in pageantry between the ages of 0 to 18 years old. The Miss Kentucky Teen America competition is a beauty pageant that selects the representative for the state of Kentucky in the Miss Teen America pageant. The current titleholder is Gena Blair. The Miss Kentucky Teen America Princess and Kentucky's Beautiful Baby Contest are offered for participants under the age of 13 to represent the state of Kentucky. The Miss Kentucky Teen America pageant is held in Danville, Kentucky.

Eligibility 
The participant must be a single, legally recognized female between the age of 13–18 years old. Specifically, the contestant has to be under 19 years old before August 1 of the upcoming pageant year. Also, the applicant must have never been married or given birth to a child. The teen entrant must not have attended college on a full-time basis prior to both the state and national pageant. Each year, the winner of the Miss Kentucky Teen America pageant competes for the Miss Teen America title, commonly held during the summer months.

Criteria 
Similar to national and international pageants, this state pageant consists of an interview, fashion modeling, active wear, and evening gown competition. Specific to the teen division, the active wear competition replaces the swimsuit competition. In addition, a fun fashion modeling competition is added. There is no talent competition. Experience is not necessary, although, it may be beneficial for a contestant. Some contestants grow up competing, while others do not. Either way, experience does not contribute to the crowning of Miss Kentucky Teen America.

To begin the interview with judges, the contestant is expected to give a 30 second introduction. From there, questions are proposed by the judges from the contestant's resume. The judges look for effective communication and valid reasoning for the contestant's opinion on current issues from a local and global perspective. During the fun fashion modeling competition, the teen selects a modest outfit of choice that reflects her personality and follows the length guidelines for shorts, skirts, and dresses. The active wear competition emphasizes the importance of health, energy, and fitness. The teens are expected to wear a sports bra, tank (optional), and shorts. During the final competition, the teen selects a floor-length gown of her choice.

Prizes and Awards 
Many young women pursue pageantry for the purpose of scholarship money. In early state competitions, winners were awarded a $1,000 scholarship. Today, the state scholarships are determined by the national organization. At the national level, the contestant crowned as Miss Teen America can earn up to a 10,000 scholarship. In the past, a teen pageant winner has received over 14,000 dollars worth of prizes. Today, the winner of Miss Kentucky Teen America receives a paid entree fee for the national pageant, Miss Teen America. In addition, she obtains a paid spokesmodel contract, as well as an interview with platform development. The winner's prizes include a state crown, rhinestone embroidered satin sash, trophy, flowers, rhinestone crown pendant, rhinestone earrings, custom tote with gifts, autograph cards, personal planner, apparel, and cosmetics.

All contestants are given a State Finalist Award and portfolio of photos.

Current Director 
Since 2006, Jessica Glasscock has served as the director of the Miss Kentucky Teen America Organization. Jessica is a graduate of the University of Kentucky with a degree in Integrated Strategic Communications. Besides her role as a director, she is a current boutique owner. In 2001, she held the title of Miss Kentucky Teen America.

Other Hosted Events

Princess Pageants 
The Kentucky Princess Pageants are offered for girls between the ages of 3 and 13 years old, who are interested in competing. This competition does not advance to a national level like Miss Kentucky Teen America does, meaning it does not require a contract and the girls are free to compete in other pageants within the state. The princess pageant winners work with the Miss Kentucky Teen America titleholder. Every year, this division is commonly hosted at the end of March. The Princess Pageant titleholder must attend a minimum of six public appearances throughout the year, have a social media platform, and participate in community service and photoshoots through the organization. There are four divisions: Kentucky's Tiny Miss (ages 3–5), Kentucky's Little Miss (ages 6–8), Kentucky's Young Miss (ages 9–11), and Kentucky's Junior Miss (ages 12–13). For the Princess Pageant, there are four categories, similar to the teen division, which are fun fashion, on-stage production, formal wear modeling, and an on-stage interview. Each of the four competitions makes up 25% of the contestant's total score. During the phase one competition, the princess will choose an outfit of her choice and give a 30 second introduction. For phase two, contestants will choose an appropriate dress of choice. The judges' scores are based on the style and fit of the dress, as well as the on-stage interview. It is a one question interview that exemplifies the young girl's personality. For example, a child may be asked to tell the audience what her favorite color is. Each princess contestant is entered in separate contests, Superlative Title Optionals, for competing in the pageant. Superlative titles for the contest include categories such as "prettiest smile" and "best dressed" that do not affect the results of the beauty pageant itself.

Beautiful Baby Contest 
In addition, the organization offers a Kentucky's Beautiful Baby Contest. In 2013, the relatively new contest began for three age divisions. The competition ages are from newborn to 11 months old, one years old, and two years old. This is a fast pace pageant where the baby or toddler dresses up in church attire or a pageant dress that is judged on color, fit, and style. The judges attention deviates towards the "happiest" baby. Similar to the Princess Pageants, there are Superlative Title Optionals that the baby or toddler is entered in. For an additional charge of $25, the contestant can be entered in a "most photogenic" contest.

Optional Contests 
For all of the teen division and some of the princess and baby divisions, there are additional contests. The contests include most photogenic, most promising model, academic achievement, community service, and an essay contest.

References

External links
Official website

Beauty pageants in Kentucky
Women in Kentucky
Miss America
Beauty pageants in the United States